Daniel Taylor (born April 28, 1986) is an English-born Canadian-Belarusian professional ice hockey goaltender who is currently an unrestricted free agent. He most recently played for HC Dinamo Minsk of the Kontinental Hockey League (KHL). He was drafted in the seventh round (221st overall) of the 2004 NHL Entry Draft by the Los Angeles Kings and has appeared in four NHL games with the Kings, Calgary Flames, and Ottawa Senators.

Internationally Taylor played for the Belarusian national team at the 2021 World Championships.

Playing career
The son of a British mother and Canadian father working for the British army, Taylor moved with his family to the Ottawa suburb of Orleans, Ontario when he was two years old. He spent three seasons in the Ontario Hockey League playing for the Guelph Storm and Kingston Frontenacs before moving onto professional hockey. Taylor spent the majority of the 2007–08 season with the Manchester Monarchs of the AHL. He played in 23 games, posting a 13–5–2 record. He also had a 2.40 GAA, 0.921 save percentage and recorded four shut-outs. He earned a recall to the Kings, and made his NHL debut on March 29, 2008, in relief of starting goaltender Erik Ersberg. Taylor played the third period, giving up two goals in what was a 7–2 loss to the Dallas Stars. Taylor returned to the Monarchs for the 2008–09 season and played 15 games, recording a 7–4–2 record. That year he had a 2.66 GAA and a 0.909 save percentage.

For the 2009–10 season Taylor was signed to a professional try-out agreement by the Syracuse Crunch of the AHL. He played in nine games that year for the Crunch, posting a 2–4–0 record before he was released from the agreement. He also had a 3.63 GAA and 0.896 save percentage.

The next year, Taylor signed with the Springfield Falcons. Taylor stayed with the team for the 2010–11 season and played in four games, having a 2–2–0 record. He had a 2.35 GAA and a 0.929 save percentage. He played the remainder of the season in Germany with the Hamburg Freezers. Taylor returned to the Falcons for the 2011–12 season. In ten games with Springfield he posted a 5–3–0 record with a 2.58 GAA and a .914 save percentage, but there was a crowded crease in Springfield with Taylor, Manny Legace, and Allen York, and Taylor was bounced out. But it did not take long for him to get signed as he was picked up by the Abbotsford Heat of the AHL.

On August 10, 2012, Taylor was extended by the Heat to a one-year contract for the 2012–13 season. He was among the AHL's goaltending leaders midway through the season with a second-best GAA of 1.77 and was fourth in save percentage at .930 when an injury to Calgary Flames' goaltender Miikka Kiprusoff led the Flames to sign Taylor to an NHL contract on February 6 and recall him to Calgary. He spent several days with the Flames, but was returned to Abbotsford without seeing action.  However, he was again recalled to Calgary on February 16, replacing Leland Irving as the backup goaltender to Joey MacDonald.

Five years after his first NHL game, Taylor finally made his second appearance (and first NHL start) on February 18, 2013, against the Phoenix Coyotes. He made 37 saves, but the Flames lost the game 4–0. In his second start, on March 3, Taylor earned his first NHL victory with a 4–2 win over the Vancouver Canucks.

A free agent following the season, Taylor chose to go to Sweden. He signed a contract to play with Färjestad BK in the SHL for the 2013–14 season and helped the team reach the finals. He then spent the 2014–15 season with HC Dinamo Minsk of the Kontinental Hockey League (KHL), before joining fellow KHL side Medvescak Zagreb. In the course of the 2015–16 campaign, he was transferred to Czech outfit HC Sparta Praha.

On July 6, 2016, the Zagreb team announced that Taylor would return for the 2016–17 season. On October 20, 2016, he transferred to fellow KHL side HC Sibir Novosibirsk.

On July 1, 2017, Taylor returned to Canada as a free agent, in agreeing to a one-year, two-way contract with the Ottawa Senators. Taylor spent most of the season with Ottawa's American Hockey League affiliate in Belleville, but was called up three games before the end of the season and played in the final game of the season against the Boston Bruins.

On April 27, 2018, Taylor returned to Russia and signed with HC Sibir Novosibirsk of the KHL for whom he played before coming to the NHL. He moved to HC Dinamo Minsk after a brief tryout in 2019.

International play
On January 26, 2021, the Belarus Ice Hockey Federation announced that Taylor as well as fellow Dynamo Minsk players Shane Prince and Francis Paré had accepted an offer to play for the Belarus men's national ice hockey team.

Career statistics

Regular season and playoffs

References

External links
 

1986 births
Living people
Abbotsford Heat players
Bakersfield Condors (1998–2015) players
Belleville Senators players
Calgary Flames players
Canadian expatriate ice hockey players in the Czech Republic
Canadian expatriate ice hockey players in Belarus
Canadian expatriate ice hockey players in Croatia
Canadian expatriate ice hockey players in Germany
Canadian expatriate ice hockey players in Russia
Canadian expatriate ice hockey players in Sweden
Canadian ice hockey goaltenders
HC Dinamo Minsk players
HC Sibir Novosibirsk players
HC Sparta Praha players
English ice hockey goaltenders
Färjestad BK players
Guelph Storm players
Gwinnett Gladiators players
Hamburg Freezers players
KHL Medveščak Zagreb players
Kingston Frontenacs players
Los Angeles Kings draft picks
Los Angeles Kings players
Manchester Monarchs (AHL) players
Ottawa Senators players
Sportspeople from Plymouth, Devon
Reading Royals players
Springfield Falcons players
Syracuse Crunch players
Texas Wildcatters players
Wheeling Nailers players
Naturalized citizens of Belarus
Belarusian ice hockey goaltenders
Sportspeople from York
English emigrants to Canada
Canadian people of British descent
Ice hockey people from Ottawa
Belarusian expatriate sportspeople in Germany